Receiver or receive may refer to:

Arts, entertainment, and media

Music

Albums
 Receiver (album), the second and final album of the band Farmer Not So John, released in 1998
 Receivers (album), the fourth full-length release from Parts & Labor, released in 2008 on Jagjaguwar Records

Songs
 "Receive" (song), a song by Canadian-American recording artist Alanis Morissette
 Receiver (single), a single by Wagon Christ
 "Receiver", a song by the American band Bright on the album Bells Break Their Towers

Other uses in arts, entertainment, and media
 Receiver (statue), a public statue in Green Bay, Wisconsin associated with the Green Bay Packers
 Receiver (video game), a 2012 first-person shooter

Roles and professions
 Receiver, a person who receives goods in a distribution center
 Receiver, in receivership, a person appointed as a custodian of another entity's property by a court of law or a creditor of the owner, pending a lawsuit or bankruptcy
 Metropolitan Police Receiver, formerly the chief financial officer of the London Metropolitan Police
 Receiver of Wreck, an official of the Maritime and Coastguard Agency of the United Kingdom, who is concerned with the management of wrecked ships and boats

Sports
 Receiver, a type of midfielder in Australian rules football
 Wide receiver, an offensive position in American and Canadian football leagues

Technology
 Receiver (firearms), which houses the working parts of the firearm
 Receiver (modulated ultrasound), a device that converts a modulated ultrasonic wave into usable information
 Receiver (radio), an electronic device that converts a signal from a modulated radio wave into usable information
 Tuner (radio), a subsystem that receives radio frequency (RF) transmissions and converts into a fixed frequency
 Receiver, the listening device part of a telephone
 The headset (audio) that can also contain the above device
 The handset that sometimes contains the above device
 AV receiver, part of a home theater system
 Citrix Receiver, a software client application used for virtualization
 Digital media receiver
 Television set, "telly" (UK), is a device that combines a tuner, display, and speakers for the purpose of viewing television
 Tuner (television), a subsystem that converts radio frequency analog television or digital television transmission into audio and video signals
 Milk receiver, the part of a milking machine setup in which milk is collected: see milking pipeline

Other uses
 Receiver (information theory), the receiving end of a communications channel

See also
 
 
 Receipt
 Receiving (disambiguation)
 Reception (disambiguation)
 Receptor (biochemistry)